Khan Lab School is an independent school in Mountain View, California, associated with Khan Academy. It is a laboratory school founded by educator Sal Khan.

Teaching model

Mastery-based learning 
KLS uses a model which is based on mastery, which means students demonstrate competence in all skills before moving on in the course.

Social and emotional learning 
The school also teaches social and emotional skills which are based on these core principles:

 Self-Awareness
 Self-Management
 Social Awareness
 Social Management
 Social Engagement

Mixed age groups 
Unlike many schools, KLS places its students in mixed-age settings in order to group students by academic progress.

Extended days 
The school's lower and middle school divisions also continue to run throughout the summer term. KLS also adopts an extended day model, in which students are expected to work independently. Students are not required to participate in extracurricular activities, but those who stay after school are expected to focus on their learning and project goals.

References

Education in California
Education in Santa Clara County, California
Educational institutions established in 2014
Education reform
Laboratory schools in the United States
Mountain View, California
Non-profit organizations based in the San Francisco Bay Area
Organizations based in the San Francisco Bay Area
Philosophy of education
Progressive education
Schools in Santa Clara County, California
2014 establishments in California